Donavon Clark (born November 12, 1992) is a former American football offensive guard. He played college football at Michigan State.

Professional career
Clark was drafted by the San Diego Chargers in the seventh round with the 224th overall pick of the 2016 NFL Draft. On August 30, 2016, Clark was placed on injured reserve.

On September 2, 2017, Clark was waived/injured by the Chargers and placed on injured reserve.

On July 25, 2018, Clark was waived by the Chargers.

References

1992 births
Living people
American football offensive guards
Michigan State Spartans football players
San Diego Chargers players
Players of American football from Cincinnati
Los Angeles Chargers players